DeSutter is derived from the Latin word sutor (shoemaker) and is widely used in Flanders. One could translate DeSutter as 'The Shoemaker'. The first record of the name is from the 13th century in Flanders. DeSutters originated in the northernwestern parts of Belgium in the Ghent (Gent - East Flanders) area near the English Channel, as well as in Northwestern France.  Variants include De Sutter, DeSoto, DeZuter, DeZutter and De Zutter.

A majority of the DeSutters in United States are descended from people who moved there in the mid to late 19th and early 20th century. Most settled in the upper plain states of the Midwest (Minnesota, Iowa, Illinois, Wisconsin and the Dakotas) for the vast farming lands as well as the Catholic mission work.

Notable people with this surname

Paula A. DeSutter, American Assistant Secretary of State 2002–2009
Wayne DeSutter, American footballer with the Buffalo Bills
Tom De Sutter, Belgian football player
Chris DeZutter, American guitar player in the band Trenchmouth

See also
Sutor, ne ultra crepidam, a Latin expression featuring the word from which the name is derived
Sutter (surname)

Sources
Minneota Chamber of Commerce
Ellis Island Heritage Foundation

Surnames of Dutch origin